Chris Lowden (born March 22, 1965) is an American professional stock car racing driver and owner of Las Vegas country music venue Stoney's Rockin' Country. He is currently scheduled full-time in the ARCA Menards Series West in 2022, driving the No. 11 Chevrolet SS for his team, Lowden Motorsports.

Racing career

ARCA Menards Series West 
In 2020, he would race in a one-off event for Kart Idaho Racing at the 2020 Star Nursery 150, retiring and finishing 15th due to brake issues.

In 2021, he was scheduled to once again for the team in the 2021 NAPA Auto Care 150, but was replaced by Andrew Tuttle.

In 2022, Lowden would announce that he would race full-time in the ARCA Menards Series West, driving for his own team with assistance from Kart Idaho Racing.

Stoney's Rockin' Country 
In 2007, Lowden would open up Stoney's Rockin' Country, after a restaurant Lowden and his friends went to at New Frontier Hotel and Casino shut down due to the closing of the casino. In 2012, the venue would move to Town Square. In 2016, Chris was sued by investors for fraud and racketeering.

In 2018, the nightclub was nominated for Nightclub of the Year by the Academy of Country Music. In May of the same year, the nightclub would open a satellite office in Nashville, Tennessee.

Personal life 
Lowden's father, Paul Lowden, is a casino magnate, and his mother, Sue Lowden, was a former state senator.

Motorsports career results

ARCA Menards Series
(key) (Bold – Pole position awarded by qualifying time. Italics – Pole position earned by points standings or practice time. * – Most laps led.)

ARCA Menards Series West 
(key) (Bold – Pole position awarded by qualifying time. Italics – Pole position earned by points standings or practice time. * – Most laps led.)

References

External links 

 

1965 births
Living people
ARCA Menards Series drivers
NASCAR drivers
Racing drivers from Las Vegas
Racing drivers from Nevada
Sportspeople from Las Vegas